Berry Hill is a hill rising to 370 m between Lachman Crags and Cape Lachman on James Ross Island. The hill is notable for an exposure of volcanic rocks and probable glacial beds of Pliocene age. Named by the United Kingdom Antarctic Place-Names Committee (UK-APC), 1987, after Alfred Thomas Berry, Chief Steward in Discovery II, 1929–39; in charge of stores on Operation Tabarin at Port Lockroy, 1943–44, and Hope Bay, 1944–45.

References

Geography of Antarctica